Hart Lee Dykes Jr. (born September 2, 1966) is a former professional American football player who played wide receiver for two seasons in the National Football League (NFL) for the New England Patriots. He was awarded the Dial Award as the national high school scholar-athlete of the year in 1984. He played two seasons, and his career was cut short when he fractured his kneecap  and because of an eye injury which occurred during a bar room fight that also involved teammate Irving Fryar in 1990. He was also drafted into the Chicago White Sox minor league system in 1989.

Background 
He was the winner of the Pitch, Hit and Run competition as a 10-year-old.  He was honored at the 1977 MLB All-Star Game. Dykes played high school basketball with LaBradford Smith, and the duo lead their high school, Bay City, to the 4A State Championship in 1985. He was also part of his high school's track team, which won a state championship in 1984.

Playing career 
At OSU, he was a member of a talented offense with Mike Gundy at quarterback and Thurman Thomas and later, Barry Sanders at running back. Dykes was selected in the first round (16th pick) of the 1989 NFL Draft. In two seasons with the Patriots, Dykes caught 83 passes for 1,344 yards and seven touchdowns.

Post-playing career 
, Dykes was the owner of a trucking company in Sugar Land, Texas.

Philanthropy 
Dykes is a major advocate for charities such as the Jimmy Fund and Autism Awareness.

References

1966 births
Living people
All-American college football players
American football wide receivers
New England Patriots players
Oklahoma State Cowboys football players
People from Bay City, Texas
Players of American football from Texas